The 1992–93 Kategoria e Dytë was the 46th season of a second-tier association football league in Albania.

First round

Group A 
 KS Besëlidhja Lezhë (qualified to the semifinals)
 KS Burrel Mat
 KS Korabi Peshkopi
 KS Kopliku
 KS Kukësi
 KS Mamurrasi
 KS Puka
 KS Rrësheni
 KS Rubiku
 KS Valbona Bajram Curr

Group B 
 KS Naftëtari Kuçovë (qualified to the semifinals)
 KS Amaro Divas Tiranë
 KS Dajti Tiranë
 KF Erzeni Shijak
 KS Iliria Fushë-Krujë
 KS Poliçani
 KS Skrapari Çorovodë
 KS Studenti Tiranë
Incomplete list

Group C 
 KS Bylis Ballsh (qualified to the semifinals)
 KS Butrinti Sarandë
 KS Delvina
 KS Luftëtari Gjirokastër
 KS Përmet
Incomplete list

Group D 
 KS Shkumbini Peqin (qualified to the semifinals)
 Akademia U.T. "Skënderbeu" Tiranë
 KS Cërriku
 KS Gramozi Ersekë
 KS Gramshi
 KS Skënderbeu Korçë
Incomplete list

Source:

Second round

Semifinals

Final 

 Besëlidhja are promoted to 1993–94 National Championship.
Source:

References

 Giovanni Armillotta
 Calcio Mondiale Web

Kategoria e Parë seasons
2
Alba